[[File:IBM magnetic disk drives 3330+3333.png|thumb|"Expanded channel capacity and the ability to use the high-performance IBM 3330 disk storage under either Operating System (OS)or Disk Operating System (DOS) were ... among the factors significant to the 's ...capabilities."]]

The IBM System/370 Model 135''' was announced March 8, 1971,
the only 370 introduced that year. The 135 was IBM's fifth System 370, and it was withdrawn October 16, 1979.

Special features
Although microcode was not a uniquely new feature at the time of the 135's introduction, the ability to upgrade a system's microcode without changing hardware was not common at that time. "Later models like the 85 and 25 had writable control stores, the 85 using a volatile SRAM array and the 25 using a part of core memory."

A "reading device located in the Model 135 console" allowed updates and adding features to the Model 135's microcode.
 The 145, introduced the prior year, also had this feature.

Optional features
The Model 135 was the last of the 370s to be introduced without Virtual memory. Four of the five could be upgraded. Unlike the 155 & 165, which required an expensive 
hardware upgrade to add a DAT box (Dynamic Address Translation), the 135 & 145  could get obtain their virtual memory upgrade from a floppy disk.

Microcode upgrades were also available to add "user-selected options such as 
  extended precision arithmetic or 
  emulation of the IBM 1400 series."

An upgraded Model 135 was termed a 370/135-3

Customers of the 370/135 had a choice of four main memory sizes, ranging from 96K to 256K.

Other
  The 370/135 was introduced as running "under either OS or DOS. Newer versions thereof (DOS/VS and OS/VS1) and Virtual Machine Facility/370 (VM/370) subsequently became available options once the 135's microcode was upgraded to support virtual memory. This was priced at $120,000 and came with "increased reloadable control store in addition to some power units." The upgrade could be done "in the field" and the resultant system was now deemed a 370/135-3.
  The 135 was "partly developed at Hursley, UK."

External links
  370 /135 Advertisement: "Presentamos el Sistema/370 Model 135"

Images
  System/370 Model 135 operator's console
  370/135 with some peripherals

See also
 List of IBM products
 IBM System/360
 IBM System/370

References

IBM System/360 mainframe line